The A6 road in Northern Ireland runs for 71.4 miles (114.9 km) from Belfast to Derry, via County Antrim and County Londonderry. From Belfast to Randalstown the route has been superseded by a motorway (the M2 and M22). Mostly single carriageway, there are sections of dual carriageway in Antrim town centre and from Randalstown to Toome, including the Toome bypass. In urban and suburban districts of Belfast and Derry the route is single carriageway with 4 lanes (2 lanes in each direction). In rural parts, there are numerous climbing lanes along the route. The A6 is one of Northern Ireland's most important arterial routes, as the road runs between its two largest cities and urban areas. Between Randalstown and Derry the road forms part of European route E16. There is a new dual carriageway between Drumahoe and Dungiven, which is still under construction as of February 2023.

In inner-city north Belfast the A6 route begins at Carlisle Circus at a roundabout with Clifton Street and the Crumlin Road (A52), and runs up the Antrim Road past Belfast Royal Academy and the Waterworks, towards Belfast Castle, Cavehill and Belfast Zoo through Glengormley. Much of this section is urban in character and there are many two-lane stretches, allowing vehicles to overtake or bus lanes operating at peak times or rush hour. On the outskirts of Glengormley the route passes through Sandyknowes roundabout (M2 Junction 4) where it connects with the A8(M) route towards Ballyclare and Larne. The A6 then passes through urban and suburban district known as Mallusk (including a significant business district and industrial estates) which forms the outer-most periphery of the Greater Belfast urban area.

Thereafter the A6 becomes markedly rural in aspect. It passes under the Belfast-Derry Railway Line, through Templepatrick village (via a multiplex with the A57 Ballynure-Aldergrove road), Dunadry and then enters Antrim town. Passing the Antrim Forum and the ruins of Antrim Castle, the A6 forms a multiplex with the A26 (Coleraine-Banbridge road) and crosses the Six Mile Water. Leaving Antrim town, it goes past Massereene and Shane's Castle, then heads towards Randalstown where it crosses under the old (now dismantled) railway line between Antrim and Cookstown, and almost immediately afterwards the road crosses over the River Maine. Up until this point the A6 runs parallel with the M2 and M22 motorways, which since their construction in the 1960s/1970s have removed the vast bulk of the cross-country traffic from the A6.

A mile west of Randalstown the A6 meets with the M22 motorway at Randalstown West junction (a non-motorway junction), and from this point onwards the A6 carries traffic bound for Mid Ulster and the North West. For 46 years from 1973 to 2019, the A6 ran for 4.1 miles along the Moneynick Road which has many twists and turns, making it difficult for traffic to safely pass slower moving vehicles; this part of the former A6 witnessed a high number of collisions, many fatal. A new offline dual carriageway opened on 4 August 2019 from Randalstown West junction to the start of the Toome Bypass dual carriageway and became the A6, the Moneynick Road being re-classified as the B183.  On the Toome Bypass, the A6 crosses the River Bann between Lough Neagh and Lough Beg to enter County Londonderry. 2.2 miles after it starts, the dual carriageway narrows and reverts to standard single carriageway, through Creagh and onto the Castledawson Bypass and crosses the Moyola River. This second stretch, from the end of the Toome Bypass to Castledawson, is also due to be upgraded to dual carriageway with grade-separated junctions by 2021 as far as the Castledawson roundabout (which will be retained), where traffic for Magherafelt and Cookstown veers off the A6 southwards along the A31.

After Castledawson, the A6 goes over generally flat agricultural land near the hamlet of Curran and the village of Knockcloghrim, and crosses the Moyola River for a second time. The route passes the town of Maghera to the south and bridges the A29 Portrush-Dundalk road which is connected to the A6 via a sliproad. This stretch has occasional overtaking lanes in either directions. The A6 route then rises up over the boggy Glenshane Pass and past The Ponderosa Bar, before descending down the valley of the River Roe to Dungiven village where the A6 crosses the Roe itself. As of 2018, Dungiven is currently the only village on the A6 that is not bypassed, leading to traffic congestion at certain times of the day. Construction started in Summer 2018 on a new dual carriageway with grade-separated junctions which, when it opens in 2022, will bypass Dungiven and end at Drumahoe on the eastern outskirts of Derry city. The existing A6 passes near Claudy and Killaloo, which will both be bypassed by the new dualling scheme currently under construction.

Entering the Derry urban area, the A6 goes through Drumahoe, widens to facilitate overtaking lanes and passes Altnagelvin Hospital. At Altnagelvin Roundabout the A6 meets the A514 Crescent Link dual carriageway which forms part of an eastern and northern bypass of Derry City, and takes traffic around the city across the River Foyle via the Foyle Bridge. The main A6 road continues towards the city centre via the Dungiven Road and the Glendermott Road. The A6 ends at the bottom of the Glendermott Road at a traffic-light controlled junction with the A2 Limavady Road. City-bound traffic then follows the A2 along King Street and Duke Street before crossing the double-decked Craigavon Bridge over the River Foyle into the city centre.

Investment 
Investment in the northwestern region has recommenced with two separate projects under development which will see  of high-quality dual carriageway constructed. The A6 Dualling Dungiven to Derry scheme will see  of dual carriageway constructed at an estimated cost of £320m.  In addition, the  A6 Dualling - Randalstown (M22) to Castledawson project will see  of dual carriageway road constructed at an estimated cost of £100m.

The remaining  between Castledawson and Dungiven has not been allocated funds to develop the last stage of the dualling; it is widely hoped that by the time construction is underway on the Derry-Dungiven stretch, further funds will be made available and the two largest urban centres in Northern Ireland will finally have a high standard dual carriageway link, although this looks unlikely in the current economic climate. 

In June 2008, Regional Development Minister Conor Murphy announced plans for a feasibility study into creating an A6-A5 Link Road around Derry. This will more than likely also be of HQDC standard. It has been noted that this is not a commitment on behalf of his department.

References 

Roads in Northern Ireland
Roads in County Antrim
Roads in County Londonderry